Louis Emerick Grant (born 10 June 1960) is a British television actor.

Biography
He was born in the Toxteth area of Liverpool to a Liberian father and British mother. He is the youngest of ten children. He is best known for his portrayal of Mick Johnson in the soap opera Brookside. He also played PC Walsh in 55 episodes of Last of the Summer Wine (1988, 1989, and 2004–2010). In 2003, Emerick was cast in four episodes of Casualty as Mike Bateman, the fireman husband of Tess Bateman (Suzanne Packer). Emerick and Packer had co-starred as a married couple on Brookside. He has also had roles in New Tricks, The Bill, Benidorm, Waterloo Road, Cold Feet and Coronation Street. He has appeared in films such as Layer Cake. He came third in the 2008 series of Celebrity Master Chef.

In 2014, Emerick starred in an episode of the soap opera Doctors. In September 2014, Emerick began playing the role of Horse in the touring production of The Full Monty. He has also starred in several other plays and pantos. 2016–present he stars in Dave TV comedy Zapped as Herman the mungo pub landlord. In 2018, Emerick had a brief recurring role as Mike in the long-running soap opera Coronation Street. Then in 2020, he appeared in an episode of the BBC soap opera Doctors as Gary Taile.

Filmography

Film

2022//  Saving Christmas Spirit // Coach Ferguson//

Television

References

External links 
 

Living people
English people of Liberian descent
English male soap opera actors
Black British male actors
Male actors from Liverpool
20th-century English male actors
21st-century English male actors
1960 births